Gjoka is an Albanian surname. Notable people with the surname include:

Ernest Gjoka (born 1970), Albanian football coach

Lola Gjoka (1910–1985), Albanian pianist

Pjetër Gjoka (1912–1982), Albanian film and theatre actor

Sokol Gjoka, Albanian diplomat